Dorset Collegiate (officially called Dorset Collegiate High School) is a school in Pilley's Island, Newfoundland and Labrador, Canada. The principal is Mark Warren and the vice principal is Mark Walters.

The school is in Division B of the 3A Provincial Slo-Pitch Tournament and Division A of the 3A Boys Volleyball Provincials. The school also participates in the annual Under 14/16/19 Atlantic Team Qualifier badminton tournament and the 3A Ball Hockey Tournament. In 1978, Dorset Collegiate participated in a student exchange program with Riverdale High School in Montreal, Quebec. In 2008, Dorset Collegiate hosted the annual review of the Royal Canadian Sea Cadets. In 2009, Courtney Woodford, a Dorset Collegiate student, won the Miss Talent title at the Miss Teen Newfoundland & Labrador Pageant. The school's 2009 graduation ceremonies were cancelled due to the death of Jonah Winsor, the captain of the school's hockey team. Winsor died in a single-vehicle accident near the school. He was driving a Kawasaki motorcycle at the time.

References

High schools in Newfoundland and Labrador
School buildings completed in 1977
1977 establishments in Newfoundland and Labrador
Educational institutions established in 1977